KLEN (106.3 FM) is a radio station broadcasting a top 40 (CHR) format. Licensed to Cheyenne, Wyoming, United States, the station serves the Cheyenne area. The station is currently owned by Townsquare Media.

On January 15, 2021, KLEN began simulcasting sister station KCGY, with a new format expected to debut on KLEN, once the simulcast ended.

On February 1, 2021, KLEN dropped the simulcast with KCGY and launched a top 40/CHR format, branded as "106.3 Now FM".

Former logos

References

External links
Official Website
Flash Stream, MP3 Stream

LEN
Radio stations established in 1983
Contemporary hit radio stations in the United States
Townsquare Media radio stations